Juan Eduardo Lescano (born 29 October 1992) is an Argentine professional footballer who plays as a striker for Finnish club Haka.

Career
After initially moving to Europe with Liverpool F.C. as a 17 in early 2010, Lescano joined Real Madrid in July of the same year. Following his release from the Real Madrid youth team in 2011, Lescano spent the first half of 2012 at Al-Ahli Club before signing for FC Lugano in August 2012. In June 2013, Lescano signed for Russian FNL side Yenisey Krasnoyarsk.

On 26 July 2017, SKA-Khabarovsk announced Lescano had moved to FC Anzhi Makhachkala, with Anzhi confirming the following day that he had signed a three-year contract with the club.

On 17 July 2018, Lescano joined FC Tobol on loan for the 2018–19 season. He returned to Anzhi in January 2019.

On 20 September 2019, Lescano returned to Yenisey Krasnoyarsk on a contract until the end of the season.

On 6 August 2021, Lescano signed for Brisbane Roar. On 9 July 2022, Lescano left Brisbane Roar by mutual consent.

On 10 February 2023, Lescano joined Haka in Finland on a one-year contract.

Career statistics

Club

References

External links

1992 births
Sportspeople from Buenos Aires Province
Living people
Argentine footballers
Association football forwards
Internacional de Madrid players
FC Lugano players
FC Yenisey Krasnoyarsk players
FC SKA-Khabarovsk players
FC Anzhi Makhachkala players
FC Tobol players
Brisbane Roar FC players
FC Haka players
Russian First League players
Russian Premier League players
Kazakhstan Premier League players
A-League Men players
Argentine expatriate footballers
Expatriate footballers in England
Argentine expatriate sportspeople in England
Expatriate footballers in Spain
Argentine expatriate sportspeople in Spain
Expatriate footballers in Switzerland
Argentine expatriate sportspeople in Switzerland
Expatriate footballers in Russia
Argentine expatriate sportspeople in Russia
Expatriate footballers in Kazakhstan
Argentine expatriate sportspeople in Kazakhstan
Expatriate soccer players in Australia
Argentine expatriate sportspeople in Australia
Expatriate footballers in Finland
Argentine expatriate sportspeople in Finland